Moskosel is a locality situated in Arvidsjaur Municipality, Norrbotten County, Sweden, with 232 inhabitants in 2010.

References

External links
 
 Home page

Populated places in Arvidsjaur Municipality
Lapland (Sweden)